Karl Kraus (21 March 1938 – 9 June 1988) was a German theoretical physicist who made major contributions to the foundations of quantum physics.

Life and work

Kraus was born in 1938 in Hohenelbe/Giant Mountains, today Vrchlabí. After the war, he grew up in Elsterwerda and attended local schools. He studied physics from 1955 to 1960 at the Humboldt University of Berlin (East) and the Free University of Berlin (West). He graduated in 1962 with a thesis about Lorentz's theory of gravity, carried out under the supervision of Kurt Just. Kraus then joined as an assistant to Günther Ludwig at the University of Marburg, where he qualified in 1966. In 1971, he accepted a professorship at the Institute of Physics of the University of Würzburg, where he established a mathematical physics working group on the topic of the foundations of quantum theory. In 1980 Kraus spent a sabbatical year at UT Austin with John Archibald Wheeler, Arno Böhm, George Sudarshan, William Wootters, and Wojciech Zurek.

Throughout his academic life, Kraus dealt with the question of the connection between the non-locality of the quantum world and the obvious locality of the classical world. He did work on this topic covering the Einstein–Podolsky–Rosen effect and issues regarding the measurement problem in quantum theory, a problem which, in his opinion, was largely ignored in the Copenhagen interpretation by the founders of quantum theory.

Some of Kraus' important publications on the measurement problem in quantum theory were:

Measuring processes in quantum mechanics I: Continuous observation and the watchdog effect.
Measuring processes in quantum mechanics II: The classical behavior of measuring instruments.
States, Effects, and Operations.

In the book States, Effects, and Operations Kraus described the measurement process in quantum mechanics for the first time using the concept and mathematical formalism of a quantum operation, a special class of maps of density operators. The representation he used for these maps is now known as the Kraus Representation, Kraus Operator Formalism or Operator-Sum Formalism, and is now frequently used in the field of quantum information. The Kraus representation is based on a theorem of WF Stinespring about completely positive images of finite-dimensional C*-algebras. For a modern proof of the Kraus representation, which is based on a theorem of Man-Duen Choi instead of Stinespring's set, see M. Nielsen, I. Chuang.

The issues discussed by Kraus regarding the foundations of quantum theory are still a current area of research. New theoretical advances are discussed in E. Joos, HD Zeh, C. Kiefer, D. Giulini, J. Kupsch, I.-O. Stamatescu. These decoherence theories have been combined with modern experiments, particularly those done by the groups of Serge Haroche (Paris) and Anton Zeilinger (Innsbruck, Vienna), in an attempt to use the measurement process in quantum theory to better understand relationship between quantum and classical world.

In addition to mathematics and physics, Kraus had a special interest in biology, acquiring an extensive knowledge on the subject and even publishing some biological work. Karl Kraus died in 1988 at age 50 from the effects of cancer.

References

External links 
  Georg Reents: Nachruf auf Karl Kraus 
 G. Reents, B. Schiekel: In memoriam Karl Kraus (1938–1988) – curriculum vitae (PDF; 67 kB)

1938 births
1988 deaths
20th-century German physicists
Theoretical physicists
People from Vrchlabí